The 1918 Geneva Covenanters football team was an American football team that represented Geneva College as an independent during the 1918 college football season. Led by second-year head coach Philip Henry Bridenbaugh, the team compiled a record of 4–2, outscoring its opponents 63 to 36. Samuel A. Steele, who played at guard, was the team's captain at the outset of the season, but he died of pneumonia induced by the Spanish flu in October, after the team's opening game against The Kiski School. Stewart, who played at center, served as captain when the team resumed play in November.

Schedule

References

Geneva
Geneva Golden Tornadoes football seasons
Geneva Covenanters football